This is a summary of 1976 in music of all genres in the United Kingdom, including the official charts from that year.

Overview
This year saw the emergence of disco as a force to be reckoned with, a trend which would hold for the rest of the decade and peak in the last two years. This was also the year which truly established ABBA as the top selling act of the decade with them achieving their second, third and fourth number ones (as well as releasing the biggest-selling album of the year). The ABBA formula was also replicated in the biggest-selling song of the year - the Eurovision-winning "Save Your Kisses for Me" by Brotherhood of Man, who began a three-year run in the UK charts from 1976. Other acts to achieve notable firsts were Elton John, who scored his first UK number one single this year (albeit as a duet with Kiki Dee), Showaddywaddy had their first and only number one and long-standing hitmaker Johnny Mathis also scored his biggest hit this year. The album charts saw TV advertising become a major factor in changing the landscape of big sellers with non-regular singles artists achieving high sales with compilations. Among these were Slim Whitman, Bert Weedon, Glen Campbell and The Beach Boys, who remained at number one for ten consecutive weeks.

Also emerging this year was a new trend, which became known as punk rock. This was little evident on the charts as yet, and was more a lifestyle choice, but would become much more significant the following year, as many new acts who typified the trend came onto the scene.

Overall, 1976 is not considered a vintage year by music critics, with its overwhelming dominance by pop and MOR acts. Certainly, many consider 1976 to be the nadir of British music and hold the year's charts up to be the very reason why Punk and New Wave music emerged with such force the following year.

Britain's foremost classical composers of the late 20th century, including Sir William Walton, Benjamin Britten and Sir Michael Tippett, were still active.  Sir Charles Groves conducted the Last Night of the Proms, and the soloist for "Rule Britannia" was contralto Anne Collins; the programme included Walton's Portsmouth Point overture.

Events
6 March - EMI Records reissues all 22 previously released British Beatles singles, plus a new single of the classic "Yesterday". A number of them hit the UK charts at the same time.
7 March - A wax likeness of Elton John is put on display in London's Madame Tussaud's Wax Museum.
9 March - The Who's Keith Moon collapses on stage ten minutes into a performance at the Boston Garden.
3 April - Brotherhood of Man win the Eurovision Song Contest for the UK with the song "Save Your Kisses For Me". It goes on to be the biggest-selling Eurovision winner ever.
3 May - Paul McCartney and Wings start their Wings over America Tour in Fort Worth, Texas. This is the first time McCartney has performed in the US since The Beatles' last concert in 1966 at Candlestick Park.
19 May - Rolling Stones guitarist Keith Richards is involved in a car accident. Cocaine is found in his wrecked car. Richards is given a court date of 12 January 1977.
2 July - Benjamin Britten is created Baron Britten of Aldeburgh in the County of Suffolk, less than six months before his death.
4 July - Elton John performs for a crowd of 62,000 at Shaffer Stadium, Foxboro, Massachusetts, as part of the United States Bicentennial celebrations. 
5 August – A drunken Eric Clapton, appearing at the Birmingham Odeon, calls on his audience to support Enoch Powell and oppose immigration.
11 August – Keith Moon, drummer of the Who, is rushed to hospital for the second time in five months, in a "mentally disturbed" state, after trashing his Miami hotel room.
11 September - Sir Charles Groves conducts the Last Night of The Proms, which includes music by Britten, William Walton, Frederick Delius and other British composers. Anne Collins is guest soloist.
20 September & 21 September - 100 Club Punk Festival, the first international punk festival is held in London. Siouxsie and the Banshees play their first concert.
8 October - The Sex Pistols sign a contract with EMI Records.
November - The recently formed Rock Against Racism pressure group holds its first gig, featuring Carol Grimes.

Charts

Number One singles

Number One albums

Year-end charts
Between 5 January and 10 December 1976.

Best-selling singles

Best-selling albums
The list of the top fifty best-selling albums of 1976 were published in Music Week and in Record Mirror at the end of the year, and reproduced in the second edition of the BPI Year Book in 1977. However, in 2007 the Official Charts Company published album chart histories for each year from 1956 to 1977, researched by historian Sharon Mawer, and included an updated list of the top ten best-selling albums for each year based on the new research. The updated top ten for 1976 is shown in the table below.

Bands formed
Elvis Costello & the Attractions 
The Jam 
The Clash 
The Cure 
The Damned 
Generation X 
Madness 
UK Subs

Bands disbanded
Soft Machine 
The Pretty Things 
Argent 
Deep Purple (they reform in 1984)

Classical Music: new works
Benjamin Britten - Welcome Ode for young people's voices and orchestra
Jonathan Harvey -  I Love the Lord
Alun Hoddinott - A Contemplation upon Flowers
Daniel Jones - Dance Fantasy
William Mathias - Zodiac Trio
William Walton - Varii Capricci

Opera
Peter Maxwell Davies - The Martyrdom of St Magnus
Iain Hamilton - Tamberlaine (radio)

Film and Incidental music
John Addison - Swashbuckler (US film).

Musical films
Bugsy Malone
The Slipper and the Rose

Births
16 January - Stuart Fletcher (The Seahorses)
21 January - Emma Bunton, singer (Spice Girls) and actress
8 March - Gareth Coombes (Supergrass)
15 March - Roger Ratajczak, singer (Code Red)
17 March - Stephen Gately, Irish singer (Boyzone) (died 2009)
3 April - Will Mellor, singer and actor
6 April - James Fox, singer-songwriter
18 April - Sean Maguire, singer and actor
8 May - Ian "H" Watkins (Steps)
10 May - Stuart Braithwaite, singer-songwriter and guitarist (Mogwai)
2 June - Tim Rice-Oxley (Keane)
13 June
Jason "J" Brown, singer (5ive)
Kym Marsh, singer (Hear'Say)
19 June - James Hearn, singer (Ultra)
22 June - Gordon Moakes (Bloc Party)
3 July - Shane Lynch, Irish singer (Boyzone)
10 July - Philip Howard, pianist and composer
28 July - David Oliver, singer (Point Break)
12 August - Stuart MacRae, composer
16 September - Tina Barrett, singer (S Club 7)
18 September - Adam Mates, Irish singer (OTT)
1 October - Richard Oakes, guitarist (Suede)
29 October - Mark Sheehan, Irish singer and guitarist (Mytown, The Script)
16 November - Dan Black (The Servant)
12 December - Dan Hawkins, English guitarist, songwriter, and producer (The Darkness and Stone Gods)
29 December - Brett Adams, singer (Point Break)

Deaths
5 January - Mal Evans, Beatles' former roadie and patron of Badfinger, 40 (shot)
8 January - George Baker, singer, 90
13 January - Isolde Menges, violinist, 82
19 March - Paul Kossoff, guitarist, (Free), 25 (drug-related)
26 March - Duster Bennett, blues musician, 29
14 May - Keith Relf, vocalist (The Yardbirds), 33 (electrocuted)
15 May - David Munrow, early music performer, 33 (suicide)
26 May - Dame Maggie Teyte, operatic soprano, 88
30 May - Hugo Rignold, violinist and conductor, 71
24 August - Michael Head, pianist and composer, 76
26 October - Deryck Cooke, musicologist and broadcaster, 57
28 November - Harold Darke, organist and composer, 88
4 December - Benjamin Britten, composer, 63
date unknown - Malcolm Boyle, organist and composer, 74

See also 
 1976 in British radio
 1976 in British television
 1976 in the United Kingdom
 List of British films of 1976

References

External links
BBC Radio 1's Chart Show
The Official Charts Company

 
British
British music by year